There are two main types of appeal in South African law:

 appeals from lower courts of law to higher courts of law; and
 administrative appeals.

The latter falls squarely within the province of administrative law. These internal or domestic remedies are an important adjunct to judicial review, which is a type of external check on the administration, but there can be a blurring of these internal and external safeguards, in that courts of law may be and sometimes are entrusted with the merits in their system. While administrative appeals normally lie from one administrative agency to another, they may lie to specialized courts of law and even to ordinary courts of law.

See also 
 South African administrative law

References 
 C. Hoexter Administrative Law in South Africa 2 ed (2012).

Notes 

Appellate review
Law of South Africa